Mojados: Through the Night is a 2004 documentary film directed by Tommy Davis.  The film documents the journey of four men  as they trek 120 miles across the Texas desert.

Summary

Filmed over the course of ten days the film follows four men into the world of illegal immigration. Alongside Bear, Tiger, Handsome, and Old Man, director Davis takes a 120-mile cross-desert journey  that has been traveled innumerable times by nameless immigrants like these four migrants from Michoacán, Mexico. Davis tells the stories of these migrants as their dehydrated days evading the U.S. Border Patrol turn into sub-zero nights filled with barbed wire, storms and ever-present confrontation with death.

Awards 
SXSW Film Festival - Audience Award
Arizona Intl. Film Festival - Best Documentary
Santa Fe Film Festival - Best Documentary
San Antonio Underground - Grand Prize
Kansas International Film Festival - Audience Award

References

External links
Official site

2004 films
Mexican documentary films
2000s Spanish-language films
Documentary films about illegal immigration to the United States
2004 documentary films
American documentary films
Films shot in Texas
2000s English-language films
2000s American films
2000s Mexican films